The Castle Mountains are located in the Eastern Mojave Desert, in northeastern San Bernardino County, California and Clark County, Nevada. The range lies south and east of the New York Mountains, southwest of Searchlight and west of Cal-Nev-Ari, Nevada.

The range lies at the northeastern end of the Lanfair Valley, and reaches an elevation of 5,543 feet above sea level at the summit of Hart Peak. The mountains lie in a southwest-northeasterly direction in both states, although most of the range is in California. The Piute Range lies to the southeast.

Canadian NewCastle Gold Ltd. currently holds the rights to the Castle Mountain Mine Area, an open pit gold mine in the southern Castle Mountains. The company has the right to excavate nearly 10 million tons of ore through 2025. Due to low gold prices, however, mining has been suspended since 2001.

Castle Mountains National Monument
Castle Mountains National Monument was established by President Obama on 12 February 2016.  It designates a portion of the Castle Mountains and the surrounding area a national monument, managed by the National Park Service. It protects 20,920 acres between the interstates I−15 and I−40. The old mining camp of Hart close to the California−Nevada border is in it.

Castle Mountains National Monument is surrounded on three sides by the NPS Mojave National Preserve.

The national monument surrounds the Castle Mountain Mine Area. The proclamation establishing the monument states that after any mining and reclamation are completed in the Area, or after 10 years if no mining occurs, the Federal land in the 8,340 acre Castle Mountain Mine Area is to be transferred to the National Park Service.

See also

References

External links
National Park Service: official Castle Mountains National Monument website
Campaign for the California Desert.org: Castle Mountains National Monument — natural and cultural features.
 Hart Peak hike and trip report. June 2020.

 Lanfair Valley
 Mountain ranges of the Mojave Desert
 Mountain ranges of San Bernardino County, California
 Mountain ranges of Clark County, Nevada
 Mountain ranges of the Lower Colorado River Valley
 Mountain ranges of Southern California
 Bureau of Land Management areas in California
 Bureau of Land Management areas in Nevada
 Mountain ranges of Nevada